Oteseconazole, sold under the brand name Vivjoa, is a medication used for the treatment of vaginal yeast infections.

It was approved for medical use in the United States in April 2022. It was developed by Mycovia Pharmaceuticals.

Society and culture

Names 
Oteseconazole is the international nonproprietary name (INN).

References

Further reading

External links 
 
 
 
 

Trifluoromethyl compounds
Fluoroarenes
Pyridines
Tetrazoles
Tertiary alcohols